Abdul-Salam Abdul-Rafiq is a Ghanaian journalist and the Upper West Regional correspondent for Joy FM. He is known for his unique reports sign outs, which usually ends with Wa prolonged Wa-a-a-a-a!. In 2012, he was among the awardees for the Upper West Region's Young Achievers award including Alban Bagbin by the National Youth Authority due to his reportage.

References 

Living people
Ghanaian journalists
Year of birth missing (living people)